The Mount Jukes mine sites were a series of short-lived, small mine workings high on the upper regions of Mount Jukes in the West Coast Range on the West Coast of Tasmania.

Upper Lake Jukes and Lake Jukes had short lived mining companies incorporating the names of the lakes.

These mine sites (including Jukes Proprietary on the northern edge of Mount Jukes above the King River Gorge) are examples of early twentieth century ingenuity where all equipment was transported with difficulty up small tracks from locations such as Crotty.

Access to parts of the slopes of Mount Jukes have been assisted by the construction of the Mount Jukes road by the HEC following their construction of the King River Dam and the impoundment of Lake Burbury.

List of mines 
This list incorporates mines on Mount Darwin as the mineral zone of Mount Jukes is frequently cited as the Jukes-Darwin mineral zone.
 From the north:
 Jukes Proprietary  – copper and gold
 Lake Jukes         –  copper – low grade
 Hydes             –  copper – low grade
 Hal Jukes          –  copper – low grade
 Taylours Reward    –  barite
 East Darwin        –  copper
 Findons            –  copper
 Mount Darwin       –  copper and gold
 Prince Darwin      –  copper and gold

See also
 West Coast Tasmania Mines

Notes

References
 
 

 Wyman, B., Cooke, D. and Large, R. Granite Related Copper-Gold Mineralisation in the Southern Mount Read Volcanics, Western Tasmania, Australia pp. 17–20 . 1997. Third International Mining Geology Conference, 10–14 November 1997 Launceston, Tasmania  

Gold mines in Tasmania
Copper mines in Tasmania
West Coast Range
Former mines in Australia